Heegondhu Dina ( A Day Like This) is a 2018 Indian Kannada-language film starring Sindhu Loknath. The director, editor and cinematographer is Vikram Yoganand. The film is produced by Chandrashekar under Smart Screen Productions banner. The songs and background music are scored by Abhilash Gupta.

Plot 
It is an uncut, experimental film shot between 6 am to 8.30 am, as the story unfolds during that time frame. It is just the girl in the movie, and she is in every frame while others come and go. The run time of the film and of its  are both two hours.

Cast 

 Sindhu Loknath
 Praveen Tej
 Padmaja Rao
 Guruprasad
 Mithra
 Shobaraj
 Girish Shivanna
 Girija Lokesh
 Balaji Manohar

Music
The songs are scored by Abhilash Gupta.

The film was slated for release on 9 March 2018, to coincide with International Women's Day, but was later released on 30 March 2018.

References

External links
 

2018 films
Indian drama films
2010s Kannada-language films